The Federation of Unions of South Africa (FEDUSA) is the second largest national trade union center in South Africa.

History
The federation was founded on 1 April 1997, when the Federation of South African Labour Unions merged with the Federation of Organisations Representing Civil Employees.  Many affiliates of the Federation of Independent Trade Unions also joined.  On founding, about 80% of its members were white-collar workers, and 70% were white.

The federation worked closely with the World Confederation of Labour, but did not affiliate.  Instead, in 1998, it affiliated to the International Confederation of Free Trade Unions, and has continued membership of its successor, the International Trade Union Confederation (ITUC).  In 2006, it began negotiating a merger with the rival National Council of Trade Unions.  They formed an umbrella organisation, the South African Confederation of Trade Unions, in 2007, but it achieved little, and the two federations remained independent.

The federation has favoured negotiation over industrial action.  In 2015, it advised its public sector affiliates to accept a pay rise lower than that offered, in order to reduce government expenditure.  It has placed a strong focus on its union education programme.  In 2019, its long-term general secretary was dismissed after being accused of corruption.  By 2020, it claimed a membership of 700,000, although the ITUC quoted a figure of 500,000.

Affiliates

Current affiliates
The following unions were listed as affiliates, as of 2021:

Former affiliates

Leadership

General Secretaries
1997: Chez Milani
2006: Dennis George
2019: Riefdah Ajam

Presidents
1997: Mary Malete
2008: Danie Carstens
2011: Koos Bezuidenhout
2016: Godfrey Selematsela

References

External links
 

 
1997 establishments in South Africa
International Trade Union Confederation
National trade union centres of South Africa
 
Trade unions established in 1997
Trade unions in South Africa